Rene (Rip) Riopelle (born April 12, 1942) was a Canadian football player who played for the Hamilton Tiger-Cats and Montreal Alouettes. He won the Grey Cup with the Tiger-Cats in 1963. He previously played football for the North Bay Tiger-Cats. He is a member of the North Bay Sports Hall of Fame.

References

1942 births
Hamilton Tiger-Cats players
Living people